Blink is a 2022 American horror short film directed by Spenser Cohen from a screenplay co-written with Anna Halberg. It stars Alicia Coppola, Scot Nery, and Sophie Thatcher. The plot follows a paralyzed woman's attempts to alert her nurse of a sinister force by blinking her eyes. The film premiered at SXSW on March 13, 2022. It was released on YouTube on March 14.

Premise
Mary arrives in a hospital after suffering a traumatic brain injury. Conscious but unable to move, her only form of communication is to blink her eyes to yes or no questions. Mary tells her nurse a supernatural entity tried to kill her by throwing her from a window. After the nurse leaves to get help, the entity enters the room. The entity pushes her hospital bed to a nearby window. The nurse intervenes just in time to save Mary. The entity, however, kills the nurse and Mary.

Cast
 Sophie Thatcher as Mary
 Alicia Coppola as The Nurse
 Scot Nery as The Creature
 Marsh Halberg and Jen Liu as doctors
 Angelica Pascoe

Production
Blink is the first film to be produced at the Scream Gems Horror Lab created by Sony Pictures' Screen Gems. The film was shot before the COVID-19 pandemic in two days. It was directed by Spenser Cohen from a screenplay co-written with Anna Halberg, a classmate at the USC School of Cinematic Arts. Blink was originally going to be a feature film but Cohen and Halberg changed the script to a short "proof of concept" after producer Scott Glassgold invited them to participate in the Scream Gems program. Glassgold also recommended Sophie Thatcher for the leading role after working with her on Prospect (2018). Cohen said the film was inspired by the one time he suffered from sleep paralysis and heard a noise. He said, "It goes back to that fear that we all have when we wake up at three in the morning in our bed, and we think we've heard a noise, or we see something in the darkness." To get ideas for the film, he watched Alfred Hitchcock's Rear Window and the filmography of James Wan. Cohen said the practical effects were difficult to achieve due to the film's low budget and tight filming schedule.

Release
The film premiered at SXSW on March 13, 2022, before a release on YouTube on March 14.

Reception 
PopHorror reviewed the short favorably, calling it "one of best horror shorts I've seen this past year" and praising Blinks story and special effects.

References

External links
 
 

2022 films
2022 short films
2022 horror films
American horror short films
Demons in film
Films set in hospitals
Films with screenplays by Spenser Cohen
2020s English-language films
2020s American films